Pseudorhaphitoma severa is a small sea snail, a marine gastropod mollusk in the family Mangeliidae.

Description
The length of the shell attains 6.1 mm, its diameter 2.2 mm.

Distribution
This marine genus occurs off Sumatra, Indonesia

References

 Thiele, J. 1925. Gastropoda der Deutschen Tiefsee-Expedition, 11. Wiss. Ergebn. dt. Tiefsee Exped. 'Valdivia' 17(2): 37-382

External links
 R.N. Kilburn, Turridae (Mollusca: Gastropoda) of southern Africa and Mozambique. Part 7. Subfamily Mangeliinae, section 2; Annals of the Natal Museum 34, pp 317 - 367 (1993)
 
 

severa
Gastropods described in 1925